The 2017–18 KNVB Cup was the 100th season of the annual Dutch national football cup competition. It commenced on 19 September 2017 with the first of six rounds and concluded on 22 April 2018 with the final at De Kuip in Rotterdam.

The defending champions were Vitesse from the Eredivisie, who beat AZ 2–0 in the final in the previous season on 30 April 2017.

The winner will automatically qualify for the third preliminary round of the 2018–19 edition of the UEFA Europa League. The winner will also participate in the 2018 edition of the Johan Cruyff Shield, the Dutch Supercup match at the start of the following season between the Cup winner and the champions of the 2017–18 Eredivisie.

Calendar

First preliminary round
Matches scheduled on 19 August 2017.

Second preliminary round

First round
The draw of the first round was done on 26 August 2017. 64 teams participated and played on 19, 20 or 21 September 2017.

Second round
The draw of the second round was done on 21 September 2017. 32 teams participated and played on 24, 25 or 26 October 2017.

The lowest ranked teams left were Swift and Hoek from the fifth tier of Dutch football.

Round of 16
The draw of the round of 16 was done on 26 October 2017. 16 teams are participating and will play on 19, 20 or 21 December 2017.

The lowest ranked teams left are GVVV and VVSB from the third tier of Dutch football.

Quarter-finals
The quarter-final draw was held on 21 December 2017. 8 teams participated and the matches will be played on 30 and 31 January 2018 and 1 February 2018.

The lowest ranked team left is Cambuur from the second tier of Dutch football.

Semi-finals 
The matches for the semi-finals took place on 28 February 2018.

Final

References

2017-18
2017–18 European domestic association football cups
KNVB